Jane Idleman Smith is an American scholar of Islam and former professor of Comparative Religion at Harvard University. She is currently Professor Emerita of Islamic studies at Hartford Seminary.

Biography
Smith received Bachelor of Divinity degree from Hartford Seminary and her Phd from Harvard Divinity School. She has served as Professor of Islamic Studies and Christian-Muslim Relations and co-director of the Macdonald Center for the Study of Islam and Christian-Muslim Relations at Hartford Seminary and professor of Comparative Religion at Harvard University. She also served as co-editor of The Muslim World journal.

Works
 Islam in America
 Muslim Women in America: The Challenge of Islamic Identity Today 
 The Islamic Understanding of Death and Resurrection
 Mission to America: Five Islamic Sectarian Communities in North America 
 Muslims, Christians, and the Challenge of Interfaith Dialogue
 Islam and the West Post 9/11
 An Historical and Semantic Study of the Term "islām" as Seen in a Sequence of Qurʼān Commentaries

See also
 Anna M. Gade

References 

Year of birth missing (living people)
Living people
Women scholars of Islam
Hartford Seminary alumni
Harvard Divinity School alumni